Mannheimer Hockeyclub 1907 e.V., also known as Mannheimer HC, is a German sports club based in Mannheim, Baden-Württemberg. It is best known for its field hockey department but it also has tennis and indoor hockey sections.

Both the men's and women's first team play in the Bundesliga the highest tier of German field hockey for men and women.

Honours

Men
Bundesliga
 Winners (1): 2016–17
 Runners-up (1): 2018–19
Indoor Bundesliga
 Winners (2): 2009–10, 2021–22
 Runners-up (1): 2016–17
EuroHockey Indoor Club Cup
 Winners (1): 2011

Women
Bundesliga
 Runners-up (3): 2016–17, 2019–2021, 2021–22
Indoor Bundesliga
 Winners (1): 2015–16
 Runners-up (1): 2021–22
EuroHockey Indoor Club Cup
 Winners (1): 2017

Current squad

Men's squad

Trainer:  Andreu Enrich

Women's squad

Trainer: Nicklas Benecke

References

External links
Official website

 
Field hockey clubs in Germany
Sport in Mannheim
Field hockey clubs established in 1907
1907 establishments in Germany